The Zhushan Zinan Temple is a Chinese Temple dedicated to Fude Zhengshen (福德正神) and located in Sheliao Village, Zhushan Township, Nantou County, Taiwan.

Popular Activities
1. Borrow money from the Fude Zhengshen (福德正神), the God of Prosperity 

It is believed that borrowing money from the Fude Zhengshen (福德正神), the God of Prosperity will bring good luck, good fortune, and prosperity. This is why many so people come to Zi Nan Temple to borrow money each year. This tradition has become one of the most famous activities for worshippers and tourists that come to Zi Nan Temple. See this page for a guide on how to Borrow Money from the Land God.

2. Pat the Golden Hen

Pat the Golden Hen for good luck and good fortune.

History
The temple was established in 1745. On 23 September 2017, the temple deployed a Pepper robot to help modernize the temple's image and act as a temple guide.

Transportation
The temple is accessible by bus from Taichung Station of Taiwan High Speed Rail.

See also
 Sheji (社稷)
 Checheng Fu'an Temple, Pingtung County
 Shilong Temple, Zhongliao Township
 List of temples in Taiwan
 List of tourist attractions in Taiwan

References

External links
 

1745 establishments in Taiwan
Religious buildings and structures completed in 1745
Taoist temples in Taiwan
Temples in Nantou County